VDX may refer to:

 VDX (library software) (for Virtual Document eXchange), an interlibrary loan software product
 .vdx, a filename extension for the Microsoft Visio XML drawing file format
 OSEK or OSEK/VDX (Vehicle Distributed eXecutive), a standards body for automotive electronics
 Virtual Desktop Extender, a patented technology by RES Software that enables reverse seamless windows in remote desktop environments. This allows for applications that do not run well in centralized environments to be launched and viewed from within a Terminal Server, XenApp, XenDesktop, VDI or other centralized/provisioned desktop.